The Dr. Kariadi Central General Hospital or RSUP. Dr. Kariadi, is a hospital affiliated with the Faculty of Medicine Diponegoro University. It is one of the leading hospitals of Indonesia, sited in Semarang, Central Java. The director is Hendriani Selina, M.D.

Dr. Kariadi Hospital is a Technical Implementation Unit of the Department of Health. The Hospital is supervised by the General Director of Medical Services, Ministry of Health Republic of Indonesia.

History
The hospital's history began in 1925.

1925 – 1942 (Netherlands East Indies) 
In 1919 N.F. Liem, M.D. proposed to replace and incorporate the City Hospital ("Stadverband Ziekenhuis") in Tawang with Assistant City Hospital ("Hulp Stadverband Ziekenhuis") in Alun - alun Semarang. The plan was realized by building a larger hospital in Semarang. Construction began in 1920 and was completed five years later. On 9 September 1925 the "Centrale Burgerlijke Ziekeninrichting" (CBZ) opened.

1942 – 1945 (Japanese Occupation) 
During the Japanese occupation, Dutch physicians were taken prisoner. To fill the leadership void the hospital selected Dr. Notokuworo act as Director. He was soon replaced by Dr. Buntaran Martoatmodjo until 1945. Thereafter the hospital was led by the Indonesian people. Japanese government renamed it PURUSARA CBZ, which stands for "Center for the People's Hospital" (Japanese: "Chuo Simin Byoing").

1945 – 1950 (Revolution) 
Japan was defeated by the Allies, and at the same time, Indonesia proclaimed its independence. Fighting erupted over five days in Semarang. Dr. M. Kariadi along with eight other hospital employees died during this battle. Owing to that, each year the battle is commemorated in the hospital.

1950 - (Independence) 
After independence, the hospital was renamed General Hospital Center Semarang, and in 14 April 1964 it was renamed Dr. Kariadi Hospital (Minister of Health No. SK.. 21215/Kab/1964).

Special units
The hospital serves multiple specialties:

 Neurosurgery and Epilepsy Center
 Pavilion of Garuda (Clinical Specialists and Subspecialists Center)
 Dr. Kariadi Cardiovascular Center
 Pavilion of Professor Dr. R. Budhi Darmojo (Geriatrics Center)
 Clinic of Reproductive Endocrinology and Infertility
 Physical Medicine and Rehabilitation Center
 Center of Developmental Disorder and Autism
 Center of tropical infectious diseases
 Iodine Deficiency Disturbances Laboratory
 Regional Avian Influenza and Molecular Microbiology Laboratory

Facilities
Radiology and Medical Imaging
Clinical Diagnostic Center.
Laboratory of Diagnosis
Pharmacy

References

Hospital buildings completed in 1925
Hospitals in Indonesia
Buildings and structures in Semarang